Metrodira subulata is a species of starfish in the family Echinasteridae. It is found on the seabed in shallow parts of the Indo-Pacific region.

Description
Metrodira subulata has long, slender tapering arms. The aboral (upper) surface has many granulations and large pores. The margins have a row of smooth plates and there are short spines at the junctions of the plates. The colour of the aboral surface is yellowish brown. The spines are red, which contrasts with the sombre body colour and is considered an aposematic trait.

References

Echinasteridae
Starfish described in 1840